The Valtro PM-5 is a 12 gauge Italian pump-action shotgun developed and manufactured by Valtro. The PM-5 has a removable magazine, and it is available with either a fixed or a folding stock.

Variants 
 Valtro PM-5
 Valtro PM-5-350

Users 

 : French Navy
  - is allowed as civilian hunting weapon

References

Shotguns of Italy
Pump-action shotguns